Galápagos Time (GALT) is the time observed since 1986 in the province of Galápagos, which is coterminous with the Región Insular (Insular Region) of western Ecuador. Galápagos Time is at UTC-06:00. The rest of Ecuador, the mainland, observes Ecuador Time.

Time zones
Galápagos Province